Georges Descrières (15 April 1930 – 19 October 2013) was a French actor. He appeared in 52 films and television shows between 1954 and 1996. He starred alongside Anna Karina in the 1962 film Sun in Your Eyes and portrayed the gentleman-burglar title character in the internationally successful TV series Arsène Lupin.

He was appointed an Officer of the Legion of Honour in January 2004 and appointed Grand Officer of the National Order of Merit in May 2011.

Filmography

References

External links

1930 births
2013 deaths
French male film actors
French male television actors
Male actors from Bordeaux
Sociétaires of the Comédie-Française
20th-century French male actors
French male stage actors
French National Academy of Dramatic Arts alumni
Conservatoire de Bordeaux alumni
Deaths from cancer in France
Officiers of the Légion d'honneur